Raz Segal is an Israeli historian residing in the United States who directs the Master of Arts in Holocaust and Genocide Studies program at Stockton University. He has written multiple books about the Holocaust in Carpathian Ruthenia.

Works

References

Stockton University faculty
Living people
Year of birth missing (living people)
21st-century Israeli historians
21st-century male writers